This is a list of members of the South Australian Legislative Council from 1900 to 1902.

This was the sixth Legislative Council to be affected by the amendments to the Constitution in 1881, which provided for the Colony to be divided into four districts: (1) Central; (2) Southern; (3) North-Eastern and (4) Northern, with six members in each division; one third of each to be replaced in rotation every three years. (Previously, the whole colony acted as one electoral district "The Province" with one third replaced at General Elections every four years.)

It was the first Legislative Council to be affected by provisions of the (State) Constitution Act 779 of 1901, which provided for, inter alia, a reduction in the number of seats from 24 to 18, realignment of District borders to encompass Assembly electorates, six-year terms (one half of the Council retiring every three years), and elections held jointly with the House. As a result of this Act, brought in to realise some of the savings promised by Federation, a number of members had their expected terms cut short.

References
Parliament of South Australia — Statistical Record of the Legislature

Members of South Australian parliaments by term
20th-century Australian politicians
19th-century Australian politicians